Stonglandseidet is a village in Senja Municipality in Troms og Finnmark county, Norway. The village has a population (2001) of 225.  The village is home to a grocery store, bank, nursing home, Stonglandet Church, and a public school.

The village is located at the southern end of the island of Senja on the isthmus connecting the main part of the island to the Stonglandet peninsula.

References

Villages in Troms
Populated places of Arctic Norway
Senja